Raúl Andrés Tarragona Lemos (born 6 March 1987) is a Uruguayan footballer who plays for Central Español as a forward.

External links
 Profile at BDFA 
 

1987 births
Living people
Footballers from Montevideo
Uruguayan footballers
Uruguayan expatriate footballers
Association football forwards
Central Español players
C.A. Bella Vista players
Racing Club de Montevideo players
Liverpool F.C. (Montevideo) players
Ansan Greeners FC players
Kelantan FA players
C.A. Rentistas players
Club Sportivo Cerrito players
Uruguayan Primera División players
Uruguayan Segunda División players
Chilean Primera División players
K League 2 players
Malaysia Premier League players
Uruguayan expatriate sportspeople in Chile
Uruguayan expatriate sportspeople in Ecuador
Uruguayan expatriate sportspeople in South Korea
Uruguayan expatriate sportspeople in Malaysia
Expatriate footballers in Chile
Expatriate footballers in Ecuador
Expatriate footballers in South Korea
Expatriate footballers in Malaysia